Sally May Carbon  (born 14 April 1967, in Perth, Western Australia) represented Australia from 1987 until 1994 in field hockey. She was a striker, midfielder and half back. Carbon was super fast and set up many goals for Australia during her 125-game career. She was a ballet dancer, swimmer and runner in her youth.

Carbon has two areas of studies, in physical education and also in strategic marketing. Sally has written for newspapers, is a radio host and has been a high level Communications and Marketing Manager. She consults in strategic marketing and has also published four children books: I want to be an Olympian, I want to be a Footballer,I want to be a Cricketer and I want to be an Olympian II. She is part of team that has produced an AFL anthology called Best on Ground. Sally is an Australian Sports Commissioner and a director of other companies, has an Australian Institute of Company Directors qualification and been awarded a Medal of the Order of Australia (OAM) for services to sport.

Sporting Record
Gold 1988 Seoul Olympics 
5th 1992 Barcelona Olympics 
Silver 1990 Sydney World Cup 
Gold 1994 Dublin World Cup

Junior WA Track Athletics team 125 Internationals for Australia in Hockey

External links
 
 Sally Carbon Home Page

1967 births
Living people
Field hockey players at the 1988 Summer Olympics
Field hockey players at the 1992 Summer Olympics
Olympic medalists in field hockey
Olympic field hockey players of Australia
Australian female field hockey players
Medalists at the 1988 Summer Olympics
Olympic gold medalists for Australia
Recipients of the Medal of the Order of Australia
Recipients of the Australian Sports Medal
People educated at Churchlands Senior High School
Sportswomen from Western Australia
Field hockey players from Perth, Western Australia
20th-century Australian women